Angélique Lalonde is a Canadian short story writer from British Columbia, whose debut collection Glorious Frazzled Beings was shortlisted for the 2021 Giller Prize.

She previously won the Journey Prize in 2019 for the short story "Pooka".

Lalonde, who is of Québécois descent, received a Ph.D. in anthropology from the University of Victoria in 2013.

References

External links

21st-century Canadian short story writers
21st-century Canadian women writers
Canadian women short story writers
Franco-Columbian people
Métis writers
Writers from British Columbia
University of Victoria alumni
Living people
Year of birth missing (living people)